Sapperton may refer to:
Sapperton, Derbyshire, England
Sapperton, Gloucestershire, England
Sapperton Tunnel (two railway tunnels)
Sapperton Canal Tunnel
Sapperton, Lincolnshire, England
Sapperton, New Westminster, British Columbia, Canada
Sapperton Station, New Westminster, Canada